Atergatis subdentatus, also known as the red reef crab, dark-finger coral crab or eyed coral crab, is a species of crab in the family Xanthidae.

Description

Atergatis subdentatus has a compact shape, and may appear either uniform crimson in colour, or may have an irregularly mottled yellow on a crimson background. It normally has an orange spot in the centre of the carapace, often with two small, white 'eyes' within.

The arms have a flattish inner surface with two, inward-pointing teeth. Beside the teeth are brush-like hairs grouped together in four or five bundles.

Distribution
The type locality for this species is Japan, and it can be found around many of the Japanese islands. It also occurs in the waters of Taiwan, Singapore, and rarely in the Lakshadweep Islands and Gulf of Mannar.

Habitat

References

Further reading

External links

Xanthoidea
Crustaceans described in 1835